Susan L. Douglass is an American-born Muslim.  She is a former social studies teacher and author 
affiliated with the Council on Islamic Education.  She is a senior research associate at the Ali Vural Ak Center for Global Islamic Studies at George Mason University. She was formerly affiliated with the Prince Alaweed bin-Talal Center for Muslim Christian Understanding at Georgetown University.

Douglass holds a M.A. in Arab Studies from Georgetown University and a B.A. in History from the University of Rochester.

She was an advisor to the 2002 PBS broadcast documentary Muhammad: Legacy of a Prophet (2002).

Books

 World Eras: Rise and Spread of Islam, 622-1500 (Thompson/Gale, 2002)
 Ramadan (Carolrhoda Books, 2002),

References 

Living people
American Muslims
Georgetown University Graduate School of Arts and Sciences alumni
University of Rochester alumni
Schoolteachers from Virginia
Year of birth missing (living people)
21st-century American women educators
21st-century American educators